The 2001–02 Nemzeti Bajnokság I, also known as NB I, was the 100th season of top-tier football in Hungary. The league was officially named Borsodi Liga for sponsoring reasons. The season started on 14 July 2001 and ended on 26 May 2002.

Overview
It was contested by 12 teams, and Zalaegerszegi TE won the championship.

First stage

League standings

Results

Rounds 1–22

Rounds 23–33

Second stage

Championship playoff

League standings

Results

Relegation playoff

League standings

Results

Statistical leaders

Top goalscorers

References
Hungary - List of final tables (RSSSF)

Nemzeti Bajnokság I seasons
1
Hungary